Patrick Gudauskas (born  November 20, 1985 in La Jolla) is an American/Lithuanian professional surfer.
He won several surfing competitions including the 2008 O'Neill Sebastian Inlet Pro.

References

External links
  Profile at World Surf League

1985 births
Living people
Sportspeople from San Diego
American surfers
Lithuanian surfers

Lithuanian Decent